Azenia implora is a species of moth in the family Noctuidae (the owlet moths). It is found in North America. It was discovered in 1883 and can be found in California, Arizona, and New Mexico.

The MONA or Hodges number for Azenia implora is 9729.

References

Further reading

 
 
 

Amphipyrinae
Articles created by Qbugbot
Moths described in 1883